Marcus Weinstock (born 15 February 1984) is a Swedish former professional ice hockey forward. He most notably played for Örebro HK in the Swedish Hockey League (SHL).

Playing career
Weinstock came to Färjestads BK as a junior. After playing for the club's junior team he was loaned out to second league club Bofors IK in 2003. He played with Bofors until the 2005–06 season when Bofors no longer wanted him. Instead, Färjestad loaned him to IFK Arboga, where Weinstock's uncle, Ulf Weinstock, was the coach. Weinstock played very well while with Arboga, scoring 15 points in 20 games. During the 2005–06 season he also played one game with Färjestads BK in Elitserien.

Before the 2006–07 season, he signed with Allsvenskan club Växjö Lakers. He stayed there for two seasons before signing with Leksands IF before the 2008–09 season. Since the 2010–11 season he has played for Örebro HK, helping the club secure their status from the Allsvenskan to the SHL.

In his tenth season with Örebro HK, Weinstock served as an alternate captain posting 6 goals and 14 points in 46 games, before the remainder of the 2019–20 season was cancelled due to the COVID-19 pandemic. The abrupt finish to the season ended his 17-year professional playing career, opting to remain with Örebro HK as the new Talent Developer and Head Coach at the U16 level on 1 June 2020.

Career statistics

References

External links

1984 births
Living people
People from Varberg
IFK Arboga IK players
Bofors IK players
Färjestad BK players
Huddinge IK players
Leksands IF players
Swedish ice hockey forwards
Örebro HK players
Sportspeople from Halland County